The 2016 season for the  cycling team began in January at the Trofeo Felanitx-Ses Salines-Campos-Porreres. The team participated in UCI Continental Circuits and UCI World Tour events when given a wildcard invitation.

Team roster

Riders who joined the team for the 2016 season

Riders who left the team during or after the 2015 season

Season victories

National, Continental and World champions 2016

Footnotes

References

External links
 

2016 road cycling season by team
2016
2016 in German sport